Melancholy II, original title Melancholia II, is a 1996 novella by the Norwegian writer Jon Fosse. It is set in 1902, on the day of the Norwegian artist Lars Hertervig's death, and is told from the perspective of Hertervig's fictitious sister Oline. The book is the sequel to Fosse's 1995 novel Melancholy, which is about Hertervig's time as a student.

Reception
Øystein Rottem of Dagbladet wrote: "On one level this is a shiveringly reductive novel. Here existence is pressed down to the most elementary level: the oral and anal, food and feces." Rottem wrote that the story also has a religious aspect: "The connection between these two layers makes Melancholy II one of Fosse's most consistent works—and that is no small feat! You won't become happier by reading the book, but it grabs us more intensely than the vast majority of what otherwise is written nowadays."

Publishers Weekly wrote in 2014: "In this coda to the acclaimed Melancholy, Fosse’s presentation of commonplace events is almost unbearably intense. ... Admirers of the first book will find this novel subtler and more profound than its predecessor, and new readers will discover a stunning, haunting meditation on age."

References

External links
 Publicity page at the Norwegian publisher's website 
 Publicity page at the American publisher's website

1996 novels
Fiction set in 1902
20th-century Norwegian novels
Norwegian-language novels
Norwegian novellas
Novels about artists
Novels by Jon Fosse
Sequel novels
Works about painters